Twilight Zone literature is an umbrella term for the many books and comic books which concern or adapt The Twilight Zone television series.

Comics
Gold Key Comics published a long-running Twilight Zone comic that featured the likeness of Rod Serling introducing both original stories and occasional adaptations of episodes. The comic outlived the television series by nearly 20 years and Serling by nearly a decade.  A later revival of Twilight Zone comics was published by Now Comics, spinning off of the 1980s revival of the show.

In 2008, The Savannah College of Art & Design and publisher Walker & Company collaborated to produce a series of graphic novel adaptations of episodes from the series that were written by Rod Serling.

Beginning in December 2013, comics publisher Dynamite Entertainment ran a multi-issue series, written by J. Michael Straczynski and with art by Guiu Vilanova.

Guides
Marc Scott Zicree's episode-by-episode guide of the original series, The Twilight Zone Companion (1982), was published by Bantam Books).  Later editions were updated to include a brief chapter acknowledging the 1985 revival series, although no additions or corrections were made to the previously existing text.

Martin Grams, Jr.'s volume, The Twilight Zone: Unlocking the Door to a Television Classic (2008), covers production information for each episode of the original series in great detail.  At 800 pages, it is much longer and more detailed than Zicree's guide, and makes a point of identifying and correcting Zicree's misstatements and errors.

Magazines

Beginning in 1981 and with T. E. D. Klein as editor, The Twilight Zone Magazine (also known as 
Rod Serling's The Twilight Zone Magazine)  featured horror fiction and to some extent other forms of fantasy and some borderline science fiction. The TZ Magazine reviewed and previewed new movies while publishing articles about The Twilight  Zone original and revival (The New Twilight Zone) television series, among other cultural oddities. The Twilight Zone Magazine was initially successful; by 1983 it was selling 125,000 issues a month, outselling magazines like Analog. Under Klein's
editorship, the magazine published several noted writers, including Harlan Ellison, Stephen King, Pamela Sargent, and Peter Straub. In late 1985, Michael Blaine succeeded Klein as editor. From March 1986 until its last issue of June 1989 the editor was Tappan King, who also edited its "twisted sister" publication, Night Cry.   It was the most reliable market for much of the best short horror in that period and appealed to audiences for the likes of Fangoria and Starlog, as well as for The Magazine of Fantasy and Science Fiction and Whispers. Like Omni Magazine, which it also somewhat resembled, it was published by a company better-known for "skin" magazines, Gallery's Montcalm Publishing. 

The all-fiction digest-sized companion, Night Cry, makes a cameo in The Simpsons 300th episode, "Barting Over".  On occasion, the magazine and digest reprinted often-anthologized short stories, introducing a new generation of horror aficionados to classic short stories by veteran writers, such as "The Voice in the Night" by William Hope Hodgson, and "The Bookshop" by Nelson Bond.

Novels
Numerous novelizations were published based upon episodes of The Twilight Zone. In 2003, the first Twilight Zone novel was published, entitled The Twilight Zone Book 1: Harvest Moon, which was written by John J. Miller. Two sequels were later published. The first sequel was entitled The Twilight Zone Book 2: A Gathering of Shadows which was written by Russell Davis. The second sequel was entitled The Twilight Zone Book 3: Deep in the Dark written by John Helfers.

In 2004, Black Flame released the five novelizations based on 2 episodes each from the 2002 series. Jay Russell, Pat Cadigan, Paul Woods, K.C. Winters and Christa Faust adapted the episodes.

Short story collections 
Several volumes of original short stories were published under The Twilight Zone brand, the first of which was edited by Rod Serling, himself.

 From the Twilight Zone (1962, Doubleday)
 Chilling Stories from Rod Serling's The Twilight Zone (1965, Grosset & Dunlap)
 Rod Serling's Twilight Zone Revisited (1967)
 Twilight Zone: 19 Original Stories on the 50th Anniversary (2009, Tor Books)

See also
 Fantasy fiction magazine
 Horror fiction magazine
 Online magazine
 Science fiction magazine

References

Defunct science fiction magazines published in the United States
The Twilight Zone
Fantasy fiction magazines
Horror fiction magazines
Gold Key Comics titles
NOW Comics titles